Jacob Bobo Lekgetho (24 March 1974 – 9 September 2008) was a South African footballer who played as a left back during the 1990s and 2000s

Career
Lekgetho was born in the Moletsane area of Soweto and began playing professionally with Moroka Swallows FC in 1995. He went on to make 155 appearances for the club before leaving for Russia's FC Lokomotiv Moscow in 2001. He helped the club win the league title in 2002, but returned to South Africa in 2004 following the death of his wife.

He was capped 25 times for the South African national team, making his international debut in a 1–0 win over Malta in May 2000 and playing his last match for Bafana Bafana in a 3-0 World Cup Qualifying defeat to Ghana in Kumasi on 20 June 2004. He was a member of the squad at the 2002 FIFA World Cup in South Korea and Japan where he came on as a substitute in the 3–2 defeat to Spain.

Honors
Russian Premier League : 2002, 2004
Russian Super Cup : 2003
Russian Cup (football) : 2001

Death

Hoax
On 19 February 2007, Russian web-based news source Rusfootball and Russian edition of the UEFA website reported that Lekgetho had been killed in a car accident in Cape Town. Other media such as gazeta.ru, Sport-Express, and Regnum picked up the story. On 20 February, Rusfootball published the refutation, confirming that the information was false.

Actual death
In September 2008, it was confirmed by various South African sources that Lekgetho had died in Johannesburg, aged 34, after a lengthy battle with an undisclosed illness. According to Sport-Express the illness was AIDS.

References

External links
Jacob Lekgetho's obituary

1974 births
2008 deaths
AIDS-related deaths in South Africa
South African soccer players
South Africa international soccer players
South African expatriate soccer players
Moroka Swallows F.C. players
FC Lokomotiv Moscow players
Russian Premier League players
2002 FIFA World Cup players
2004 African Cup of Nations players
Expatriate footballers in Russia
South African expatriate sportspeople in Russia
Sportspeople from Soweto
Association football defenders
Soccer players from Gauteng